This is a list of nursing schools in the continent of Europe, sorted by country. A nursing school is a school that teaches people how to be nurses (medical professionals who care for individuals, families, or communities in order to reach or maintain health and quality of life).

Finland 

 LAB University of Applied Sciences
 Novia University of Applied Sciences
 Swedish Polytechnic
Lapland University of Applied Sciences
Satakunta University of Applied Sciences
JAMK University of Applied Sciences
Savonia University of Applied Sciences

Italy 
D'Annunzio University of Chieti–Pescara
Humanitas University
Marche Polytechnic University
Magna Græcia University
Saint Camillus International University of Health and Medical Sciences
Vita-Salute San Raffaele University
Sapienza University of Rome
Università Cattolica del Sacro Cuore
University of Bari
University of Bologna
University of Brescia
University of Cagliari
Università degli Studi della Campania Luigi Vanvitelli
Università Campus Bio-Medico
University of Eastern Piedmont
University of Ferrara
University of Florence
Università degli studi di Foggia
University of Insubria
University of L'Aquila
University of Messina
University of Milan
University of Milano-Bicocca
University of Modena and Reggio Emilia
University of Molise
University of Naples Federico II
University of Padua
University of Palermo
University of Parma
University of Pavia
University of Perugia
University of Pisa
University of Rome Tor Vergata
University of Salerno
University of Sassari
University of Siena
University of Trieste
University of Turin
University of Udine
University of Verona

Poland 

 University of Economics and Innovation Lublin
Vincent Pol University in Lublin
Polonia University
Nicolaus Copernicus University
Cardinal Stefan Wyszyński University in Warsaw
Białystok Institute of Cosmetology
 Faculty of Health Sciences and Physical Culture of Kazimierz Pułaski University of Technology and Humanities in Radom

Portugal 

 Escola Superior de Enfermagem de Lisboa
Escola Superior de Enfermagem de Porto
Escola Superior de Enfermagem de Coimbra
Portuguese Red Cross Higher School of Nursing – Alto Tamega
School of Nursing S. Francisco das Misericordias

Spain 

 Comillas Pontifical University
 University of Barcelona
University of Granada
University of Salamanca
University of Murcia
University of Léon

Sweden 

 Karolinska Institute
University of Gothenburg
Swedish Red Cross University College
Malardalen University
Karlstad University
Lund University
 Red Cross University College of Nursing (Stockholm)
Uppsala University (Uppsala, Visby)

Turkey 
Acıbadem University
Atılım University
Ankara University
Bahçeşehir University
Başkent University
Dokuz Eylül University
Ege University
Gazi University
Hacettepe University
Istanbul Bilgi University
Istanbul Medipol University
Istanbul University-Cerrahpaşa
Koç University
Marmara University
Yeditepe University

United Kingdom

England 
 Florence Nightingale Faculty of Nursing and Midwifery
 School of Health Sciences, City, University of London
City, University of London
Anglia Ruskin University 
Birmingham City University
Bournemouth University (Poole)
Brunel University London
Buckinghamshire New University
Canterbury Christ Church University
Cardiff University
Coventry University
De Montfort University
Edge Hill University (Ormskirk)
Imperial College London
Keele University
Kingston University
Leeds Beckett University
Liverpool John Moores University
London South Bank University
Manchester Metropolitan University
Middlesex University
Northumbria University
Nottingham Trent University
Sheffield Hallam University
Solent University
Staffordshire University
Teesside University
Thames Valley University
Oxford Brookes University
University College Birmingham
University of Bedfordshire
University of Birmingham
University of Bradford
University of Brighton
University of Bristol
University of Central Lancashire
University of Chester
University of Chichester
University of Cumbria
University of Derby
University of East Anglia
University of East London
University of Essex
University of Exeter
University of Gloucestershire
University of Greenwich
University of Hertfordshire
University of Huddersfield
University of Hull
University of Leeds
University of Leicester
University of Lincoln
University of Liverpool
University of Manchester
University of Northampton
University of Nottingham
University of Plymouth
University of Portsmouth
University of Roehampton
University of Salford
University of Sheffield
University of Southampton
University of Suffolk
University of Sunderland
University of Surrey
University of West London
University of Winchester
University of Wolverhampton
University of Worcester
University of the West of England, Bristol
University of York
York St John University

Northern Ireland 

 Queen's University Belfast
 Ulster University

Scotland 

 Abertay University (Dundee)
 Edinburgh Napier University
 Glasgow Caledonian University
 Queen Margaret University
 Robert Gordon University
 Teesside University
 University of Dundee
 Nursing Studies, University of Edinburgh
 University of Glasgow
 University of Stirling
 University of the Highlands and Islands
 University of the West of Scotland
Queen Margaret Hospital
University of Edinburgh

Wales 

 Aberystwyth University
 Bangor University
 Cardiff University
 Swansea University
 University of South Wales
 Wrexham Glyndŵr University

References

See also 

 List of nursing schools in the United States
 List of nursing schools in Malaysia

Europe
Nursing
Nursing
Europe
Nursing
Nursing
Nursing